Altona Beach is a beach located in Altona, Victoria, Australia. A long pier is located towards the middle of the beach. From late November through to around Easter each year, volunteers from the Altona Lifesaving Club patrol the beach on the eastern side of the pier.

Heritage pier
Altona Pier is a heritage listed pier that was originally constructed c.1888 with later modifications. It is located at the intersection of the Esplanade and Pier Street.

Recreation
The end of Altona Pier, is a common fishing spot for many local anglers who live around the area. The western side of the Pier is a great place for kite surfing and these surfers are in the water throughout the year. Body-boarding and surfing are not common at Altona Beach as for most of the year the water is fairly calm, with small waves only appearing whilst a strong southerly is blowing.

Altona Dog Beach
There are several parks and reserves in Hobsons Bay where dogs are allowed off-leash. The beach is next to the Altona Sports Club, and not far from Seaholme railway station. This is an Off Leash area and many people bring their dogs to the beach at low tide to socialise and romp around. There are also dog shower facilities. Pets must be under effective voice control at all times.

Marine life
Animals found around the beach include:
Seagulls
Jelly blubber
Snapper
Gummy shark
Toadfish
Stingray
Weedy seadragon
Leatherjacket fish
Black swans

References

Beaches of Victoria (Australia)
Port Phillip